Guilford is a historic plantation house and a farm located near White Post, Clarke County, Virginia. It was built between 1812 and 1820, and is a two-story, nearly square, brick dwelling with a hipped roof in the Greek Revival style.  The front facade features a full-height, three-bay, pedimented portico with monumental Greek Ionic order columns.  Also on the property is a contributing brick slave's quarters.

It was listed on the National Register of Historic Places in 1993.

References

Plantation houses in Virginia
Houses on the National Register of Historic Places in Virginia
Farms on the National Register of Historic Places in Virginia
National Register of Historic Places in Clarke County, Virginia
Greek Revival houses in Virginia
Houses completed in 1820
Houses in Clarke County, Virginia